Anthene minima, the little hairtail, is a butterfly of the family Lycaenidae. It is found in South Africa and Botswana. In South Africa, it is found in north-eastern KwaZulu-Natal, Mpumalanga, and Limpopo.

The wingspan is 18–22 mm for males and 19–23 mm for females. Adults are on wing from September to April.

The larvae likely feed on Acacia species.

References

Butterflies described in 1893
Anthene
Butterflies of Africa